The 2019–20 FC Utrecht season was the club's 50th season in existence and the 50th consecutive season in the top flight of Dutch football. In addition to the domestic league, FC Utrecht participated in this season's editions of the KNVB Cup. The season covered the period from 2 August 2019 to 10 May 2020. Due to COVID-19, the last day of play was on 8 March 2020.

Players

First-team squad

On loan

Pre-season and friendlies

Competitions

Overview

Eredivisie

League table

Results summary

Results by round

Matches
The Eredivisie schedule was announced on 14 June 2019. The 2019–20 season was abandoned on 24 April 2020, due to the coronavirus pandemic in the Netherlands.

TOTO KNVB Cup

References

External links

Dutch football clubs 2019–20 season
FC Utrecht seasons